Chad Rempel (born May 23, 1981) is a professional Canadian football long snapper who is a free agent. He most recently played for the Edmonton Elks of the Canadian Football League (CFL). He is a two-time Grey Cup champion after winning with the Toronto Argonauts in 2012 and with the Winnipeg Blue Bombers in 2019.

University career
Rempel played five years of university football with the Saskatchewan Huskies football team.

Professional career
Rempel was drafted in the third round, 35th overall, in the 2004 CFL Draft by the Edmonton Eskimos. In 2005, Rempel joined the Winnipeg Blue Bombers as a backup wide receiver and special teams player.  On June 10, 2006, Rempel was cut by the Blue Bombers in training camp.  Rempel was later signed by the Toronto Argonauts on August 2, 2006.

On March 22, 2009, Rempel was a member of Lyndon Rush's bobsleigh team that won the Canadian four-man bobsleigh championship in Whistler, British Columbia.

Rempel was re-signed by the Toronto Argonauts on July 20, 2009. He was a member of the 2012 Grey Cup Champion team.

On April 7, 2014, Rempel was signed by the Chicago Bears. He was released on August 18.

On September 25, 2014, the Saskatchewan Roughriders signed Rempel to a one-year contract.

Rempel was signed by the Winnipeg Blue Bombers on May 30, 2015. He played for the Blue Bombers for five seasons and was a member of the 107th Grey Cup championship team.

On June 21, 2021, it was announced that Rempel had signed with the Edmonton Elks. He played in eight games for the Elks in 2021. He became a free agent upon the expiry of his contract on February 8, 2022.

References

External links
ProFootballArchives.com stats
Edmonton Elks bio 

1981 births
Living people
People from Sherwood Park
Sportspeople from Saskatoon
Sportspeople from Alberta
Canadian football long snappers
Canadian football wide receivers
American football long snappers
Canadian players of American football
Saskatchewan Huskies football players
Edmonton Elks players
Hamilton Tiger-Cats players
Winnipeg Blue Bombers players
Toronto Argonauts players
Montreal Alouettes players
Chicago Bears players
Canadian male bobsledders
Canadian Mennonites